Solamalai College of Engineering  Madurai, was established by the Arun Ram kumar Educational Trust and the college started functioning during the academic year 1995-96 with the approval of All India Council for Technical Education, New Delhi and Government of Tamil Nadu. This college was formerly known as Raja college of engineering and technology until it was taken over by Solaimalai group in the year 2014. The college is located 6 km from Anna Bus stand on Madurai-Sivagangai road.

Undergraduate courses (4 years) 
Bachelor of Engineering degree in,
Civil Engineering
Computer Science and Engineering,
Electronics and Communication Engineering,
Electrical and Electronics Engineering,
Mechanical Engineering

Postgraduate courses (2 years) 
Master of Engineering degree in,
Computer Science and Engineering
CAD/CAM
Embedded System Technologies
Soil Mechanics and Foundation Engineering
Power Electronics and Drives

Facilities
 Civil Laboratories
 Computer Science Laboratories
 Electrical & Electronics Laboratories
 Electronics Laboratories
 Mechanical Laboratories
 ME/MBA Laboratories
 Language Lab
 Library
 Transport
 Hostel
 Mess
 Internet/ Wi-Fi
 Communication (Telephone)
 Xerox
 Club  ECO, STEM, YI, GDC

References

External links 
 

Engineering colleges in Tamil Nadu
Engineering colleges in Madurai
Colleges in Madurai
Universities and colleges in Madurai
Science and technology in Madurai
Educational institutions established in 1995
1995 establishments in Tamil Nadu